Rodney Allen may refer to:

Rodney Allen (musician)
Rodney Allen, referee at 2010 FIFA Club World Cup
Rodney Allen (American football), see 2008 Green Bay Packers season

See also

Roderick Allen (disambiguation)
Allen (surname)